"Whatever" (capitalized as "WHATEVER") is a song recorded by Japanese recording artist Ayumi Hamasaki for her second studio album, Loveppears (1999). It was written by Hamasaki, while production was handled by Max Matsuura. The track is Hamasaki's sixth single with Matsuura since her debut single in April 1998, "Poker Face". "Whatever" premiered on February 10, 1999 as the lead single from the album. It was re-released on February 28, 2001 as a CD single.

Musically, "Whatever" was described as a dance song, and is written in third person narrative. Upon its release, the track garnered mixed reviews from music critics. Critics praised Hamasaki's move from pop rock to dance music, but criticized her vocal delivery and song writing. It also achieved success in Japan, peaking at number five on the Japanese Oricon Singles Chart. The re-released single peaked at number 28 on the same chart. As of March 2016, "Whatever" has sold over 218,000 units in Japan alone and was certified gold by the Recording Industry Association of Japan (RIAJ).

The accompanying music video for "Whatever" was shot in Tokyo; it features Hamasaki in a small white room with waterfalls, with inter cut scenes of an angel in the middle of a destroyed city. An alternative music video was shot for an alternative arrangement of the song; it features Hamasaki singing in front of a red backdrop. However, Avex scrapped it after they preferred the former version. For additional promotion, the song was featured on several concert tours and New Years live countdown shows by Hamasaki.

Background and composition
"Whatever" was written by Hamasaki, composed by Kazuhito Kikuchi, and produced by Max Matsuura. Japanese composer Izumi Miyazaki was in charge of arranging the song, which included instrumentation of synthesizers, keyboards, and a drum machine. It was one of three songs from the Loveppears album composed by Kikuchi. The song was also the only song from Loveppears to be arranged by Miyazaki, and was his final collaboration with Hamasaki.

"Whatever" was selected as the lead single from Loveppears and was released in Japan on February 10, 1999 by Avex Trax. The Mini CD features: the original track, the instrumental version, and alternative versions (under the alias "J Version") of the former tracks. A CD single was released on February 28, 2001 by Avex Trax in Japan, with a full-frontal body image of Hamasaki in front of a blue backdrop. She is wearing angel wings on her back, with Hamasaki's and the song's title superimposed on her. The CD single features: the original version, the instrumental, the two alternative versions, one remix of "Whatever", one remix of "Appears", and one remix of "Immature".

"Whatever" is a dance song that lasts five minutes and 36 seconds long. An extended version appeared on the album, which lasts seven minutes and 20 seconds. The song was noted for its musical similarities to other tracks from Loveppears, and is written in third person narrative. It became Hamasaki's first single to have featured any English language, with the word "Wow" in its lyrics. However, it does not count in using English–language conversation like Hamasaki did in tracks from her 2002 album Rainbow.

Critical response
"Whatever" received mixed reviews from most music critics. Alexey Eremenko, who had written her extended biography at AllMusic, highlighted the song as an album and career stand out track. A reviewer from Yahoo! GeoCities criticized Hamasaki's "thin" and "harsh" vocal delivery, but went on to state that her music have "improved" from her debut album, A Song for ×× (1999). Morimasa from Nifty.com highlighted it as one of the album's best tracks. He commented that despite the "easily" written lyrics for the sing, he commended Hamasaki's emotional delivery in both the production and her singing. A reviewer from Amazon.co.jp was positive towards the track. The reviewer praised Miyazaki's arrangement of both the original version and the J version, and commended the song's composition and Hamasaki's "homoeopathic" delivery. In early 2014, in honor of Hamasaki's sixteenth-year career milestone, Japanese website Goo.ne.jp hosted a poll for fans to rank their favourite songs by Hamasaki out of thirty positions; the poll was held in only twenty-four hours, and thousands submitted their votes. As a result, "Whatever" was ranked the lowest at thirty, with 13.6 percent of the votes.

Commercial performance
In Japan, the Mini CD format entered at number five on the Oricon Singles Chart. The Mini CD stayed in the top fifty for nine weeks, selling over 189,610 units, and was certified gold by the Recording Industry Association of Japan (RIAJ) for shipments of 200,000 units. The re-released CD single format entered at number twenty-eight on the chart, the highest entry of her re-released singles. The CD single stayed in the top fifty for three weeks, tallying both the Mini CD and the CD single to twelve charting weeks. The CD single sold an additional 27,560 units, combing both the Mini CD and the CD single sales to 217,170. "Whatever" is her thirty-fifth and fifty-seventh best selling single in Japan, her lowest in both the Loveppears and format re-release era respectively.

The Mini CD format entered at number five on the Japanese Count Down TV Chart, Hamasaki's highest charting single and first top ten at the time of February 1999. The Mini CD slipped to number fifteen the next week, and lasted nine weeks inside the top 100. "Whatever" was released twice as double A-side vinyl's with Hamasaki's single "Appears". The second vinyl managed to reach ninety-six on the Japanese Count Down chart. The re-released CD single format entered at number twenty-nine on the Count Down TV chart. The CD single stayed in the chart for three weeks, tallying the total weeks to twelve.

Music video
The accompanying music video was directed by Wataru Takeishi. This is Takeishi's first video collaboration with Hamasaki since "Trust". The overall appearance of the video was inspired by the cover sleeve of "Whatever", which also featured Hamasaki in an angel costume. Several photoshoot out takes were considered to be released in the CD single, but Avex restricted this. Because of this, only two photos of Hamasaki in the angel costume were distributed; one for the front cover, and one for the back. The music video also appeared on Hamasaki's DVD compilation box sets: A Clips, her self-titled video compilation (2000), Complete Clip Box (2004), A Clip Box 1998–2011 (2011), and the bonus DVD version with A Complete: All Singles.

Synopsis

The video opens with a bench chair inside a pale-blue room, surrounded by interior waterfalls. Glitches of Hamasaki appears, and she starts singing the song while seated. The next scene features damaged–archive footage of a destroyed town, fenced in with barbed wires. A young boy, with pale white skin, blonde dreads, and angel wings, appears in the distance. Several scenes features the boy looking towards the camera, which then inter cuts to scenes with Hamasaki singing the song in the room. The young boy wonders through the destroyed town, observing damaged homes and objects. The boy places his hands upon a dying tree, where he envisions the events of how the town became destroyed and dismantled. These scenes include burning flowers, falling construction, and broken religious statues. The second chorus has Hamasaki singing, and the song break shows the boy observing a blossoming flower which hasn't died. Smiling, he walks towards it, unbeknown that there is sharp barbed wire surrounding it. Scenes features Hamasaki singing, and shows brief inter cut scenes of barbed wire wrapped around the young boy. Struggling to become free from the wire, the young boy dies and leaves behind a large pile of angel feathers. The final scene features Hamasaki wearing exactly the same outfit as the angel, trapped in a large bird cage, in the room the video started with. The video zooms out on the overall appearance of her.

Alternative music video
An accompanying music video for an alternative version for "Whatever" (labelled the "J Version") was also directed by Takeishi. The J version, composed and arranged by Keisuke Kikuchi, was intended to be the lead single from Loveppears and use the M version as the b-side. When Kikuchi and Miyazaki submitted their J and M versions of "Whatever" to the head offices of Avex, Matsuura favored Miyazaki's version over Kikuchi. Kikuchi was disappointed of the verdict, but Avex went ahead in releasing the M version. Because Takeishi had already shot and produced the music video for the J version of "Whatever", Takeishi had to re-shoot a new video for the M version. The J Version was used in Valentine's Day commercials for 7-Eleven.

The J version features Hamasaki singing the J version on a white platform in front of a silky red backdrop. The entire full-length video has never been released, but a thirty-second snippet was used as the commercial video for "Whatever". The J version has been included on her self-titled video compilation (2000), Complete Clip Box (2004), and its most recent appearance is on the A Clip Box 1998–2011 (2011).

Live performances and other appearances
Hamasaki has performed "Whatever" on several concert tours and New Years countdown shows throughout Asia. The song has been included in one of Hamasaki's New Years countdown concerts, the 2004-2005 live tour. The song has been included on several of Hamasaki's national and Asian concert tours. The song had made its debut tour performance on Hamasaki's 2001 Dome Tour and part two of the Dome Tour. Since then, "Whatever" has been included on Hamasaki's Ayumi Hamasaki Stadium Tour 2002 A, and its most recent inclusion was on her Premium Showcase: Feel the Love concert tour in 2014. During Hamasaki's performance, she wears a metallic mini dress, and dances to back-up dancers wearing robotic outfits. "Whatever" has been included on one greatest hits compilation, which is A Complete: All Singles (2008),

"Whatever" has been remixed by several professional disc jockeys and producers, and has appeared on several remix albums by Hamasaki. This list is: the Laurent Newfield remix on Super Eurobeat Presents Ayu-ro Mix, the FPM's Winter Bossa remix on Ayu-mi-x II Version JPN, the Ferry Corsten remix on ayu-mi-x II Version US+EU, and both appeared again on Hamasaki's remix compilation Ayu-mi-x II Version Non-Stop Mega Mix (2000). The orchestral acoustic remix was included on her fifth orchestral remix album, Ayu-mi-x 7 Version Acoustic Orchestra (2011).

Track listings

Japanese and Taiwanese Mini CD
 "Whatever" (version M) – 
 "Whatever" (version J) – 
 "Whatever" (version M Instrumental) – 
 "Whatever" (version J Instrumental) – 

12 inch vinyl
 "Whatever" (Dub's 1999 Club Remix) – 
 "Whatever" (version M) – 
 "Whatever" (version M Instrumental) – 

Ferry Corsten 12 inch vinyl
 "Whatever" (Ferry 'System F' Corsten vocal extended mix) – 
 "Whatever" (Ferry 'System F' Corsten vocal dub mix) – 

Japanese CD single
 "Whatever" (version M) – 
 "Whatever" (version J) – 
 "Whatever" (Ferry 'System F' Corsten vocal extended mix) – 
 "Appears" (JP's SoundFactory mix) – 
 "Immature" (D-Z Dual Lucifer mix) – 
 "Whatever" (version M Instrumental) – 
 "Whatever" (version J Instrumental) – 

Digital EP
 "Whatever" (version M) – 
 "Whatever" (version J) – 
 "Whatever" (version M Instrumental) – 
 "Whatever" (version J Instrumental) – 

Digital Music Video
 "Whatever" (version M) – 
 "Whatever" (version M) –

Credits and personnel
Credits adapted from the singles liner notes;

Song credits
 Ayumi Hamasaki - songwriting, vocals
 Max Matsuura - production
 Kazuhito Kikuchi - composer
 Izumi Miyazaki - arrangement
 Shigeru Kasai - design

Visual and video credits
 Kiyoshi Utsumi - art direction
 Wataru Takeishi - director
 Yoshiko Ishibashi - production manager
 Tetsuji Nakamichi - assistant director
 Tetsuya Kamoto - photographer
 Koji Noguchi - lighting
 Koji Matsumoto - stylist
 Chu and Tamotsu - hair and make-up assistant

Charts and certifications

Weekly charts

Certifications

Release history

Notes

References

External links
 "Whatever" archived information at Avex Network.
 "Whatever" archived re-release information at Avex Network.
 "Whatever" archived information at Oricon.
 "Whatever" archived re-release information at Oricon.

Ayumi Hamasaki songs
1999 singles
2001 singles
Songs written by Ayumi Hamasaki
Songs with music by Kazuhito Kikuchi
1999 songs
Avex Trax singles